Pulp Fiction is a 1994 American crime film written and directed by Quentin Tarantino, who conceived it with Roger Avary, for A Band Apart and Jersey Films. It stars an ensemble cast consisting of John Travolta, Samuel L. Jackson, Uma Thurman, Harvey Keitel, Tim Roth, Amanda Plummer, Maria de Medeiros, Ving Rhames, Eric Stoltz, Rosanna Arquette, Christopher Walken, and Bruce Willis. The plot is told out of chronological order and features three main interrelated stories with different protagonists: Vincent Vega (Travolta), a hitman; Butch Coolidge (Willis), a prizefighter; and Jules Winnfield (Jackson), Vincent's business partner. The film was produced by Lawrence Bender, shot with cinematographer Andrzej Sekuła, and edited by Sally Menke on an $8 million production budget. It was theatrically released by Miramax on October 14, 1994, and was a commercial success, grossing $213.9 million worldwide.

At the 67th Academy Awards, Pulp Fiction nominated in seven categories and won Best Screenplay Written Directly for the Screen (Quentin Tarantino and  Roger Avary). At the 52nd Golden Globe Awards it received six nominations and won Best Screenplay – Motion Picture. At the 48th British Academy Film Awards it received nine nominations and won two, including those for Best Original Screenplay and Best Supporting Actor (Samuel L. Jackson). At the 47th Cannes Film Festival it won Palme d'Or award.

It became one of the seven films to win Best Picture from three out of four major U.S. film critics' groups (LA, NBR, NY, NSFC) along with Nashville, All the President's Men, Terms of Endearment, Goodfellas, The Hurt Locker, and Drive My Car.

Awards and nominations

Year-end lists 

 1st – Peter Travers, Rolling Stone
 1st – Janet Maslin, The New York Times
 1st – Michael MacCambridge, Austin American-Statesman
 1st – James Berardinelli, ReelViews
 1st – National Board of Review
 1st – Bob Strauss, Los Angeles Daily News
 1st – Yardena Arar, Los Angeles Daily News
 1st – David Stupich, The Milwaukee Journal
 1st – Scott Schuldt, The Oklahoman
 1st – Steve Persall, St. Petersburg Times
 1st – Sean P. Means, The Salt Lake Tribune
 1st – Robert Denerstein, Rocky Mountain News
 1st – Michael Mills, The Palm Beach Post
 2nd – Gene Siskel, The Chicago Tribune
 2nd – Kevin Thomas, Los Angeles Times
 2nd – Desson Howe, The Washington Post
 2nd – Christopher Sheid, The Munster Times
 3rd – Mack Bates, The Milwaukee Journal
 3rd – Dan Craft, The Pantagraph
 4th – Stephen Hunter, The Baltimore Sun
 5th –  Glenn Lovell, San Jose Mercury News
 5th – Douglas Armstrong, The Milwaukee Journal
 6th – Todd Anthony, Miami New Times
 9th – John Hurley, Staten Island Advance
 10th – Joan Vadeboncoeur, Syracuse Herald American
 Top 7 (not ranked) – Duane Dudek, Milwaukee Sentinel
 Top 9 (not ranked) – Dan Webster, The Spokesman-Review
 Top 10 (listed alphabetically, not ranked) – Mike Clark, USA Today
 Top 10 (listed alphabetically, not ranked) – Matt Zoller Seitz, Dallas Observer
 Top 10 (listed alphabetically, not ranked) – Mike Mayo, The Roanoke Times
 Top 10 (listed alphabetically, not ranked) – Bob Ross, The Tampa Tribune
 Top 10 (listed alphabetically, not ranked) – Eleanor Ringel, The Atlanta Journal-Constitution
 Top 10 (listed alphabetically, not ranked) – Steve Murray, The Atlanta Journal-Constitution
 Top 10 (listed alphabetically, not ranked) – Jeff Simon, The Buffalo News
 Top 10 (not ranked) – Howie Movshovitz, The Denver Post
 Top 10 (not ranked) – Betsy Pickle, Knoxville News-Sentinel
 Top 10 (not ranked) – George Meyer, The Ledger
 Top 10 (not ranked) – Dennis King, Tulsa World
 Top 10 (not ranked) – Bob Carlton, The Birmingham News
 Honorable mention – Kenneth Turan, Los Angeles Times
 Honorable mention – David Elliott, The San Diego Union-Tribune

Notes

References

External links 
 

Pulp Fiction
Pulp Fiction